San Pascual is a village in the province of Ávila and autonomous community of Castile and León, Spain.

References

Populated places in the Province of Ávila